Juma Saeed Worju is a South Sudanese politician. As of 2011, he was the Minister of Environment of Central Equatoria.

References

South Sudanese politicians
Living people
Year of birth missing (living people)
Place of birth missing (living people)
People from Central Equatoria